Extra Alagoas is a Brazilian newspaper published every week, in the state of Alagoas. The main line of this newspaper is to publish scandals, against powerful men and women of Brazilian state of Alagoas. It also publishes articles against famous Brazilian politicians, such as Lula and José Sarney.

Official site

 Extra Alagoas

Weekly newspapers published in Brazil
Alagoas